Jasmyn Smith (born 10 May 2004) is an Australian rules footballer playing for Gold Coast in the AFL Women's competition (AFLW).

Early life
Smith was raised on the Gold Coast, Queensland where she attended Emmanuel College and served as school vice captain in 2022. Her mother, Michaela is a Commonwealth Games bronze medallist and Australian singles champion in badminton and her father, Shane, is a former Broadbeach, Southport and Geelong Football League AFL player, and professional triathlete. Jasmyn first participated in her school's Auskick program in grade four but didn't take the sport seriously until the professional AFLW competition was established in 2017. Jasmyn was a state level netball player at the time, and her Queensland U15 team won the Australian Indoor Netball Championship. She joined the Broadbeach Cats in 2018 when the club fielded their first U17 female team which Smith joined with her older sister, Tyra, as a 13-year old. Smith would take part in three consecutive junior grand finals with Broadbeach, winning two premierships. Smith won the South East Qld league Best and Fairest award and captained her undefeated Broadbeach team in 2021.  She switched to play for Bond University in the top state level QAFLW competition and was also a member of the Gold Coast Suns academy program where she was named in their team of the year. Smith also co-captained the Queensland U18 state team. Smith excelled and was drafted by hometown team Gold Coast Suns with pick 52 in the 2022 AFL Women's draft. Along with football, Smith is a model, actress and features as a host on Network 10's Shake Takes television program.

AFLW career
Smith made her AFLW debut for the Suns in round 1 of the AFLW season seven at 18 years of age.

References

External links 

2004 births
Living people
Sportspeople from the Gold Coast, Queensland
Sportswomen from Queensland
Australian rules footballers from Queensland
Gold Coast Football Club (AFLW) players